Wim Dooijewaard (7 October 1892 – 17 July 1980) was a Dutch painter. His work was part of the painting event in the art competition at the 1936 Summer Olympics.

References

1892 births
1980 deaths
20th-century Dutch painters
Dutch male painters
Olympic competitors in art competitions
Painters from Amsterdam
20th-century Dutch male artists